Events from the year 1728 in Sweden

Incumbents
 Monarch – Frederick I

Events

Births

 
 
 
 
 
 date unknown - Johan Philip Korn, painter  (died 1796)

Deaths

 
 
 10 April - Nicodemus Tessin the Younger, architect, city planner (died 1654) 
 16 February - Maria Aurora von Königsmarck, courtier, royal mistress, amateur actress and famous beauty (died 1662)

References

 
Years of the 18th century in Sweden
Sweden